Kancabchén may refer to:

Places
Mexico
Hacienda Kancabchén, Yucatán
Hacienda Kancabchén (Halachó), Yucatán
Hacienda Kancabchén (Homún), Yucatán
Hacienda Kancabchén (Motul), Yucatán
Hacienda Kancabchén (Tunkás), Yucatán
Hacienda Kancabchén Ucí Yucatán
Hacienda Kancabchén de Valencia, Yucatán
Hacienda Kankabchén (Seyé), Yucatán
Hacienda Kankabchén (Tixkokob), Yucatán